Justice Ajonye Paperture is a South Sudanese lawyer and politician. As of 2011, she is the governor's advisor for Legal Affairs and Law Enforcement of Central Equatoria. She previously served at the office of the president before been relieved of that post. Currently she is the acting chairperson of the South Sudan Law Society.

References 

South Sudanese politicians
Living people
South Sudanese lawyers
People from Central Equatoria
Year of birth missing (living people)